Archbishop Łukasz Baraniecki (14 October 1798 – 30 June 1858) was a Roman Catholic prelate, who served as a Metropolitan Archbishop of the Roman Catholic Archdiocese of Lviv from 28 September 1849 until his death on 30 June 1858.

Life
Archbishop Baraniecki was born in the szlachta Polish Roman Catholic family in the present day Ternopil Raion. After graduation of the school and Order of Saint Basil the Great college in Buchach education, he subsequently joined Faculty of Theology of the University of Lviv and the Major Roman Catholic Theological Seminary in Lviv. He was ordained as priest on October 6, 1822, for the Roman Catholic Archdiocese of Lviv by Archbishop Andrzej Alojzy Ankwicz, when completed of the philosophical and theological studies. 

After his ordination, he served as an assistant priest, and later as a parish priest in the different parishes throughout his native Archdiocese. In 1838 he was appointed as a dean of the Cathedral Basilica of the Assumption, Lviv and simultaneously as a dean of Lviv deanery. This service he fulfilled until his archbishop's nomination.

On September 28, 1849, he was confirmed by the Pope Pius IX as a Metropolitan Archbishop of Roman Catholic Archdiocese of Lviv. On January 13, 1850, he was consecrated as bishop by Bishop Franciszek Ksawery Wierzchleyski and other prelates of the Roman Catholic Church and the Ukrainian Greek-Catholic Church in the Cathedral Basilica of the Assumption, Lviv.

Archbishop Baraniecki died, while in the office, on June 30, 1858, during a canonical visitation by cause of a stroke and was buried in the crypt of the Mary Gromnicza Church.

References

1798 births
1858 deaths
People from Ternopil Oblast
People from the Kingdom of Galicia and Lodomeria
Polish Austro-Hungarians
19th-century Polish nobility
Clan of Sas
University of Lviv alumni
Archbishops of Lviv
19th-century Roman Catholic archbishops in Poland
Ukrainian Roman Catholic archbishops
Clergy from Lviv